Southern Railway Depot, also known as the North Wilkesboro Depot, is a historic train station located near North Wilkesboro, Wilkes County, North Carolina. It was built in 1914 by the Southern Railway, and is a long, one-story brick building with American Craftsman style design elements.  It measures 36 feet wide and 240 feet long and has a low hipped roof with overhanging eaves.  Passenger service ceased in 1955.

It was listed on the National Register of Historic Places in 2004.

References

North Wilkesboro
Railway stations on the National Register of Historic Places in North Carolina
Railway stations in the United States opened in 1914
National Register of Historic Places in Wilkes County, North Carolina
Former railway stations in North Carolina